The Pentecostal Collegiate Institute refers to two antecedents of the Eastern Nazarene College in Massachusetts:

Pentecostal Collegiate Institute (New York)
Pentecostal Collegiate Institute (Rhode Island)